Lufotrelvir (PF-07304814) is an antiviral drug developed by Pfizer which acts as a 3CL protease inhibitor. It is a prodrug with the phosphate group being cleaved in vivo to yield the active agent PF-00835231. Lufotrelvir is in human clinical trials for the treatment of COVID-19, and shows good activity against COVID-19 including several variant strains, but unlike the related drug nirmatrelvir it is not orally active and must be administered by intravenous infusion, and so has been the less favoured candidate for clinical development overall.

See also 
 3CLpro-1
 Bemnifosbuvir
 Baloxavir marboxil
 Favipiravir
 GC376
 GRL-0617
 Molnupiravir
 Remdesivir
 Ribavirin
 Rupintrivir
 S-217622
 Triazavirin

References 

Anti–RNA virus drugs
Antiviral drugs
COVID-19 drug development
Pfizer brands
Amides
Pyrrolidones
Phosphonic acids
Indoles
Methoxy compounds
SARS-CoV-2 main protease inhibitors